René Kučera (born September 17, 1972) is a Czechoslovak-Czech sprint canoer who competed in the early to mid-1990s. Competing in two Summer Olympics, he earned is best finish of seventh in the K-2 1000 m event for Czechoslovakia at Barcelona in 1992.

References
Sports-Reference.com profile

1972 births
Canoeists at the 1992 Summer Olympics
Canoeists at the 1996 Summer Olympics
Czech male canoeists
Czechoslovak male canoeists
Living people
Olympic canoeists of the Czech Republic
Olympic canoeists of Czechoslovakia